The Bolton Group is an Italian conglomerate that sells products under more than fifty brands.

Overview
The Bolton Groups is a global conglomerate which sells products under more than 50 major brands, primarily consumer goods with a heavy focus on seafood. The majority of their business is food related. They are based in Milan, Italy. As of 2019, they had twelve factories and more than 44 offices.

History
The Bolton Group was founded by Joseph Nissim, a Greek-born Jewish immigrant to Italy. Joseph Nissim was born in 1919, to a Jewish family and escaped Thessaloniki when the Nazis invaded Greece. After fleeing Greece he joined the British Army and fought with distinction at the battle of El Alamein. He settled in Italy in 1949. He died age 100 in 2019.

In 2016, the Bolton Group had €1.96 billion in revenue and  €210.8 million in profits.

In 2018, Bolton announced that they were adopting a more progressive tuna sourcing policy. Greenpeace had been critical of Bolton's sourcing practices.

As a result of the COVID-19 epidemic sales of the Bolton Group’s canned seafood products boomed in Europe.

They are a leading consolidator in the tuna and seafood industries.

Subsidiaries

Tri Marine
Tri Marine is one of the three largest global tuna traders along with FCF and Itochu. Tri Marine is based in Bellevue, Washington and was founded in 1971. In 2019, Tri Marine was sold to the Bolton Group. Tri Marine has more than 5,000 employees and operates 16 purse-seiners. After the sale Tri Marine named Juan Corrales as the new CEO replacing Renato Curto who had held the position for 35 years.

Rio Mare 
Rio Mare is an Italian seafood company which is now a Bolton Group brand/subsidiary. In 2017, Rio Mare launched a brand of organic tuna certified by the Marine Stewardship Council. Rio Mare operates a factory in Cermenate.

Garavilla
In 2015, the Bolton Group acquired a majority stake in Spanish seafood company Garavilla from MCH and Investment Portfolio Dularra. Garavilla owns a factory in Ecuador.

Saupiquet
Saupiquet is a French seafood company. In 2019, they commissioned a new 67m seiner from the Piriou shipyard.

UHU
UHU is a German manufacturer of adhesive products. They were acquired by the Bolton Group in 1994.

Brands
 Palmera – Italian canned seafood
 Saupiquet – French canned seafood
 Isabel – Spanish canned seafood
 Garavilla – Spanish seafood
 Petreet – Pet food
 Ocean Naturals – Seafood
 Choice landing – Seafood
 Simmenthal C anned meat

References

Companies based in Milan
Fish processing companies
Multinational companies headquartered in Italy
Conglomerate companies of Italy
Multinational food companies
Chemical companies of Italy
Seafood companies of Europe
Fishing in Italy
Food and drink companies of Italy